Michael Drmota (born 17 July 1964 in Vienna) is an Austrian mathematician and professor at  TU Wien.

He studied Mathematics at TU Wien and finished his PhD in 1986<ref>{{cite web
 |url=https://www.tuwien.at/en/studies/studying-at-tu-wien/promotio-sub-auspiciis
 |title=TU Wien list of Phd graduates ``sub auspiciis praesidentis |access-date=4 January 2021}}</ref> under the supervision of Robert F. Tichy.
At the same university he acquired habilitation in 1990  and is now
full professor at the Institute of Discrete Mathematics and Geometry, where he also served as head of institute from 2004 to 2012.

He had visiting professor positions at UVSQ, University Paris VI, and University of Provence (Marseille).
From 2013 until 2019 he was dean of the Faculty of Mathematics and Geoinformation,
from 2010 to 2013 president of the Austrian Mathematical Society.  Since 2013 he is corresponding member of the Austrian Academy of Sciences.

1992 he won the Edmund und Rosa Hlawka-Preis'' of the  Austrian Academy of Sciences, and 1996 the Prize of the Austrian Mathematical Society.

His research areas are number theory, enumerative combinatorics,  analysis of algorithms and stochastic processes on combinatorial structures.

Selected publications

References

External links 
 Drmota's website at TU Wien
 

20th-century Austrian mathematicians
21st-century Austrian mathematicians
Academic staff of TU Wien
1964 births
Living people